The A414 is a major road in England, which connects the towns of Hemel Hempstead in Hertfordshire and Maldon in Essex. The road commences at the A41, at a junction west of Hemel, and travels through the town to junction 8 of the M1 motorway at Buncefield. From there, it runs parallel to the M1 until junction 7, heading south of St Albans and east through Hatfield and Hertford. The road then crosses the A10 and into Essex; it travels through Harlow, Chipping Ongar and Chelmsford, before terminating at Maldon.

History
The section between the M1 and the Park Street roundabout junction south of St Albans was formerly classified as the M10 motorway. This was downgraded to A road status on 1 May 2009, following the completion of the M1 widening between junctions 7 and 8 of the M1.

Between the (former) M10 Junction 1 at Park Street, and the A1 junction, the A414 is named the North Orbital Road which reflects the planners' intent to build an outer orbital road around London. The North Orbital Road route was never completed, the planners opting to build the M25 orbital motorway instead.

The A414 route has always connected Hemel Hempstead and Maldon, but over the years it has changed so much that it is almost completely new. The original route from Hemel Hempstead to St Albans followed the course of what is now the A4147, then from St Albans to Hatfield on the course of what are now the A1057 and B6426. The villages of Cole Green, Birch Green, and Staines Green were bypassed in the 1990s by a new dual carriageway that linked into the 1970s Hertingfordbury bypass. On the other side of Hertford, the A414 took what is now the A119 Ware Road, and then diverged along the course of the current B1502 and B181 from Hertford to Stanstead Abbotts.  Between November 2009 and April 2011 the section between junction 7 of the M11 and Southern Way in Harlow was widened from three to four lanes and the Southern way roundabout completely remodelled.

Most of the Essex section (between the Talbot at Tylers Green and Writtle) was originally the A122. The original A414 road bypassed Harlow to the north, travelling through High Wych on what is now an unclassified road, and travelling through Sawbridgeworth to meet what is now the A1060 at Hatfield Heath, which it followed through to Chelmsford. In Chelmsford itself, the road numbers have been subject to change several times over the last three or four decades, with the A12, A130 and A414 having been rerouted many times over that period.

References

Roads in England
Transport in Harlow
Transport in Epping Forest District
Transport in the City of Chelmsford
Roads in Essex
Roads in Hertfordshire